Wang Xiuting (born 11 May 1965) is a Chinese former long-distance runner. She won the gold medal at the 1989 World 15km Road Race Championships, silver at the 1988 World 15 km Road Race Championships, and bronze in the 10,000 metres at the 1991 World Championships.

Career
Born in Qingdao, Shandong province, Wang Xiuting rose to prominence with a victory in the 10,000 metres at the 1986 Asian Games in Seoul. She represented China in the long race at the 1987 IAAF World Cross Country Championships and came in 28th place. Wang made her track debut at the global level later that year at the 1987 World Championships in Athletics – she came seventh in the 10,000 m but didn't get past the heats of the 3000 metres. She took both the 5000 metres and 10,000 m crowns at the VI Chinese National Games at the end of the year. At the 1988 IAAF World Cross Country Championships she came fourteenth in the long race.

She made her Olympic debut at the 1988 Seoul Olympics, running in the heats of the 3000 m and taking seventh place in the 10,000 m final. She took the silver medal at that year's IAAF World Women's Road Race Championships, finishing behind Ingrid Kristiansen. She returned to the competition in 1989 and won the women's gold medal as well as a team title alongside Zhong Huandi. Her winning time of 49:34 was a Chinese record for the 15 km distance. Her 1990 season was highlighted by a silver medal in the 10,000 m at the 1990 Asian Games in Beijing, where she was beaten by Zhong.

The highlight of her career came at the 1991 World Championships in Athletics, where she won the 10,000 m bronze medal, finishing after Liz McColgan and Zhong. That December she won the Sanyo Half Marathon in Okayama, running a course record time of 1:10:14. She had her best Olympic performance the following year when she came sixth in the 10,000 m final at the 1992 Barcelona Olympics. Wang also set a marathon best of 2:28:56 at the Osaka International Ladies Marathon that year, where she finished in fifth place. Her final major appearances came in 1993: she was the runner-up at the Beijing Marathon behind Li Yemei, and won another 10,000 m silver behind Zhong, this time at the inaugural East Asian Games.

International competitions

References

External links

1965 births
Living people
Runners from Shandong
Athletes from Qingdao
Chinese female long-distance runners
Chinese female marathon runners
Olympic female long-distance runners
Olympic athletes of China
Athletes (track and field) at the 1988 Summer Olympics
Athletes (track and field) at the 1992 Summer Olympics
Asian Games gold medalists for China
Asian Games silver medalists for China
Asian Games medalists in athletics (track and field)
Athletes (track and field) at the 1986 Asian Games
Athletes (track and field) at the 1990 Asian Games
Medalists at the 1986 Asian Games
Medalists at the 1990 Asian Games
World Athletics Championships athletes for China
World Athletics Championships medalists
IAAF World Women's Road Race Championships winners
Japan Championships in Athletics winners